"I Feel It" is a song credited to DJ Darren Briais vs DJ Pee Wee Ferris The song was released in 1995 and peaked at number 20 on the Australian singles chart.

At the ARIA Music Awards of 1996, the song was nominated for the ARIA Award for Best Dance Release.

Track listings
 "I Feel It" (Radio version) - 4:11
 "I Feel It" (Extended version) - 6:38
 "I Feel It" (Acid Underground) - 6:16
 "I Feel It" (Peewee's Tripping Out mix) - 7:31
 "I Feel It" (BS Happy Hardcore mix) - 5:49

Charts

Weekly charts

Year-end charts

References

 
1995 singles
1995 songs